is a town located in Miyagi Prefecture, Japan. , the town had an estimated population of 36,014, and a population density of 800 persons per km2 in 13,568 households. Rifu is known for its nashi pears. Recently, wine and candy made from nashi pears have been developed in the town.

Geography
Rifu is located in east-central Miyagi Prefecture, bordered by Sendai metropolis to the south and by Matsushima Bay to the east.

Neighboring municipalities
Miyagi Prefecture
Sendai
Tagajō
Shiogama
Tomiya
Ōsato
Taiwa
Matsushima

Climate
Rifu has a humid climate (Köppen climate classification Cfa) characterized by mild summers and cold winters.  The average annual temperature in Rifu is 11.9 °C. The average annual rainfall is 1237 mm with September as the wettest month. The temperatures are highest on average in August, at around 24.4 °C, and lowest in January, at around 0.6 °C.

Demographics
Per Japanese census data, the population of Rifu has increased rapidly over the past 50 years.

History
The area of present-day Rifu was part of ancient Mutsu Province, and has been settled since at least the Jōmon period by the Emishi people. With the establishment of Tagajō in the Nara period, Rifu was part of the central Yamato colonization area in the region. During the Sengoku period, the area was contested by various samurai clans before the area came under the control of the Date clan of Sendai Domain during the Edo period, under the Tokugawa shogunate.

The village of Rifu was established on June 1, 1889 with post-Meiji restoration  establishment of the modern municipalities system. It was raised to town status on October 1, 1967.

Government
Rifu has a mayor-council form of government with a directly elected mayor and a unicameral town council of 18 members. Rifu, together with the rest of Miyagi District collectively contributes one seat to the Miyagi Prefectural legislature. In terms of national politics, the town is part of Miyagi 4th district of the lower house of the Diet of Japan.

Economy
The economy of Rifu is largely based on agriculture, primarily horticulture and the cultivation of rice. East Japan Railway Company's Sendai Shinkansen maintenance depot is located in Rifu.

Education
Rifu has six public elementary schools and three public junior high schools operated by the town government. The town has one public high school operated by the Miyagi Prefectural Board of Education. The prefecture also operates one special education school for the handicapped.

Transportation

Railway
 East Japan Railway Company (JR East) - Tōhoku Main Line 
  – 
 East Japan Railway Company (JR East) - Senseki Line

Highway
   – Rifu-Shiogama, Rifu-Naka, Matsushima-Kaigan interchanges; Rifu Junction
  – Rifu Junction, Rifu-Shirakashidai Interchange

Local attractions
Miyagi Stadium
Site of Rifu Castle

Sister city relations
 – Lifou Island, New Caledonia, since September 4, 1980.

Noted people from Rifu 
Hisashi Kato, professional soccer player
Tsukasa Fujimoto, professional wrestler and actress

References

External links

Official Website 

Towns in Miyagi Prefecture
Populated coastal places in Japan
Rifu, Miyagi